Mappila Muslims are a religious community of non-Indian origin in Kerala, India

Mappila may also refer to:

 Jonaka Mappila, members of a Muslim community in Kerala
 Nasrani Mappila, or Saint Thomas Christians, a Christian community in Kerala
 Juda Mappila, or Cochin Jews, a Jewish community in Kerala
 Mappila Malayalam, an alternative term of Arabi Malayalam, the traditional Dravidian language of the Mappila Muslim community
 Moplah (sword), a type of large knife formerly carried by the male members of the Muslim Mappila community

See also
 
 Mappillai (disambiguation)